Diadelia x-fuscoides is a species of beetle in the family Cerambycidae. It was described by Breuning in 1980. It is known from Madagascar.

References

Diadelia
Beetles described in 1980